Abraham Isacks op den Graeff (c. 1646 – c. 1731) was an original founder of Germantown, Pennsylvania, as well as a civic leader, award-winning weaver, and signer of the first organized religious protest against slavery in colonial America. He, or his brother Derick, are briefly mentioned in John Greenleaf Whittier's poem "The Pennsylvania Pilgrim" simply as "Op Den Graaf".

Early life
Abraham op den Graeff was born c. 1646 in Krefeld, Germany.  He was the son of Isaac Herman op den Graeff and grandson of Herman op den Graeff. The Op den Graeff family were originally Mennonites, and are believed to have come from nearby Aldekerk in the Catholic Duchy of Julich about 1605 to avoid persecution.  At that time Krefeld was an exclave of the County of Moers, and under the authority of the Prince of Orange of the Netherlands.  In contrast to the leaders of Julich and the nearby Electorate of Cologne, the leaders of the Netherlands were tolerant of non-conforming religions. As a result, Krefeld had become a point of refuge for the persecuted Mennonites. Many of the Krefeld Mennonites were weavers, or practiced other cloth making trades such as dying.  Abraham himself was a weaver.

Quaker missionary work in the lower and middle Rhine River valley during the 1660s resulted in the conversion of a number of Mennonites in and around Krefeld.  Among these converts were Abraham Op Den Graeff and his family.  The Quakers were not as readily tolerated by the people of Krefeld.  In 1679 five of them, including Abraham's brother Herman, were forcibly exiled from Krefeld.  They were eventually allowed to return through pressure from the English Quakers, but by this time William Penn's Colony was being established (1681-1682).  The opportunity to follow their Quaker beliefs without fear of persecution was undoubtedly a major factor in their decision to emigrate from Krefeld.  Abraham and his brothers were among the first to leave, arriving at Philadelphia, Province of Pennsylvania on the Concord in October 1683.

Germantown Settlement
Abraham op den Graeff and his family were one of the original thirteen families which founded Germantown. There he helped established the linen industry, winning the first Governor's prize from William Penn, a cousin of Abraham op den Graeff, in 1686 for the finest piece of linen woven in the Province. In 1688, Abraham along with three others signed the first organized religious petition against slavery in the colonies, the 1688 Germantown Quaker Petition Against Slavery.  In 1689, he was one of the original charter grantees for the settlement, and that year was elected to the Provincial Assembly, representing the settlement until 1692. He would also serve as a burgess of Germantown.

The Pennsylvania Pilgrim
Abraham or his brother Dirck is briefly mentioned in John Greenleaf Whittier's abolitionist poem "The Pennsylvania Pilgrim", published in 1872.

Notable descendants
His descendants used a variety of spellings of the surname, including Opdegraf(f), Updegraf (f), Uptegraft, Updegrave, Updegrove, Updegraph, Uptegrove and Upthegrove. Pennsylvania Governor Samuel Whitaker Pennypacker was the fourth great-grandson of Abraham.

References

External links 
 Transcription of the text of the 1688 Germantown Quaker Petition Against Slavery at Wikisource

1646 births
Year of birth uncertain
1731 deaths
Abolitionism in the United States
Dutch emigrants to the Thirteen Colonies
German emigrants to the Thirteen Colonies
German-American culture in Pennsylvania
People from Krefeld